Dzielów  is a village in south-western Poland, in Opole Voivodeship, Głubczyce County, Gmina Baborów.

Notable residents
 Max Chmel (1915–1945), Wehrmacht noncommissioned officer

References

Villages in Głubczyce County